The plateau frog is a species of frog in the family Dicroglossidae.

Plateau frog may also refer to:

 Guatemala plateau frog, a frog found in Guatemala and Mexico
 Plateau brown frog, a frog endemic to China

Animal common name disambiguation pages